The Kambuwal were an indigenous Australian people of the state of Queensland.

Country
They straddled the border between Queensland and New South Wales, from south of Millmerran, and Inglewood to Bonshaw. Their eastern flank ended around Stanthorpe, Wallangarra and the western scarp of the Great Dividing Range.

Alternative names
 Gambuwal.
 Gambabal.
 Gambubal.
 Kaoambul.
 Cambooble.

Notes

Citations

Sources

Aboriginal peoples of Queensland